Tiruppur is the legislative assembly, that includes the city, Tiruppur. Tiruppur assembly constituency was part of Coimbatore parliamentary constituency. It was a two-member constituency in 1952 election.

History

Post delimitations 2008 
Owing to the enormous Urban agglomeration in the Tiruppur city, Tiruppur (State Assembly Constituency) is now bifurcated into Tiruppur North and Tiruppur South constituencies.

Winners 
A total of 14 members from 13 elections have been elected from this constituency. It has elected 5 members each from Anna Dravida Munnetra Kazhagam, and 4 members each from Indian National Congress, and 2 members each from Dravida Munnetra Kazhagam, Communist Party of India, Communist Party of India (Marxist).

Madras State

Tamil Nadu

Election results

2006

2001

1996

1991

1989

1984

1980

1977

1971

1967

1962

1957

1952

References

External links

Former assembly constituencies of Tamil Nadu
Tiruppur